Tolna chionopera is a species of moth of the family Noctuidae. It is found in Africa, including Cameroon.

Catocalinae
Insects of Cameroon
Insects of the Democratic Republic of the Congo
Moths of Africa